The Milo River is a river in Guinea in West Africa.

The pre-colonial Baté Empire was founded in the seventeenth century and was situated in the Milo River valley. In the colonial period, the river was a valuable transportation route, as it was navigable to shallow-draft vessels from Kankan to the Niger River.

References

Rivers of Guinea
Tributaries of the Niger River